Blue Hills Regional Technical High School is a high school in Canton, Massachusetts. It is in the geographical center of member towns of the Blue Hills Regional School District: Avon, Braintree, Milton, Canton, Norwood, Randolph, Dedham, Westwood, and Holbrook. The school is situated on a  campus that borders the DCR's Blue Hills Reservation, and is within view of Great Blue Hill. The schools mascot is the Warriors

The Blue Hills Regional School District was formed on December 17, 1963, to serve the needs of the member towns' residents. The District School Committee was then authorized by the towns to establish and maintain educational programs at the secondary, post-secondary and adult levels in accordance with the provisions of Chapter 74 of the General Laws of Massachusetts, which require all municipalities in Massachusetts to offer vocational education for high school students that request it.

The original school building was opened to the first class in September 1966. Its success, coupled with increasing admissions, necessitated the building of additional facilities. Moreover, local employers were expressing a need for employees trained in certain skills areas. By 1976, the school had been expanded to house approximately 1,230 students in the high school, while also serving another 1,400 students in the adult education programs.

Shops
Blue Hills offers 17 sections:

Auto Body
Auto Repair
Construction Technology
Computer Information Systems (CIS)
Design and Visual Communications
Cosmetology
Criminal Justice 
Culinary Arts
Drafting/CAD
Early Education and Care
Electrical
Electronics
Pre-Engineering Technology
Graphic Communications
Health Occupations
HVAC/R
Metal Fabrication
Criminal Justice (Added in 2015)

Athletics
Baseball
Basketball
Football
Cheerleading
Golf
Ice Hockey
Lacrosse
Soccer
Softball
Swimming
Track and Field
Volleyball
Rugby (Added in 2015)
The football team has played in the MIAA Division IV State Championship game twice (1984, 2010). On December 3, 2011, Blue Hills was victorious in the MIAA Division 4A Super Bowl against Cathedral (Boston), 16–14. The football team has also played in the MIAA Small School Vocational Super Bowl twice (2012, 2013). On November 29, 2012, Blue Hills defeated Minuteman Regional, 26–8. On December 6, 2013, they defeated North Shore Tech, 23–22.

Notable alumni
 Marine Lance Corporal Alexander Scott Arredondo (1984-2004), Purple Heart - Iraq War 
 Scott Tingle - NASA Astronaut

References

External links   	 
 Official site

Educational institutions established in 1966
Schools in Norfolk County, Massachusetts
Public high schools in Massachusetts
1966 establishments in Massachusetts
Educational institutions accredited by the Council on Occupational Education
Buildings and structures in Canton, Massachusetts
1963 establishments in Massachusetts